Ang Tanging Ina Mo (Last na 'To!) ( is a 2010 Filipino dramedy film starring Ai-Ai delas Alas, Eugene Domingo, and certain others. An official entry for the 2010 Metro Manila Film Festival, it was supposed to be the last film of Ang Tanging Ina film series; however, a crossover sequel between Enteng Kabisote and Ang Tanging Ina entitled Enteng Ng Ina Mo co-starring Ai-Ai de las Alas and Vic Sotto were released. It was a co-production between APT Entertainment, M-ZET Productions, OctoArts Films and Star Cinema.

The crossover sequel was indirectly confirmed by Kris Aquino in her talk show Kris TV after discussing some of the entries of 2011 Metro Manila Film Festival including her film entry Segunda Mano which was also distributed by Star Cinema.

Plot
A few months after Ina resigns as President of the Philippines, she is back in the media limelight after releasing her memoir while living a simple life with her beloved children, together with her long-time best friend, Rowena.

After collapsing at President Ren's wedding, Ina undergoes an X-ray and medical examination. Her doctor tells her that she has brain tumor and only has 6 to 8 months to live. Ina has a hard time telling her children that about this. She is also has visions of her departed husbands, who turn out to be lookalikes of them. As her condition continues, Ina also deals with Seven's impending wedding with William, whom she dislikes, and infighting between her children. She thinks Juan, her first son, is in New Zealand but actually lives on the streets and accumulating debt. Pip turns out to have a daughter named Monay. Tudis quarrels with her husband, Troy, because of her daughter being with another man. When Ina's children find out about her sickness, they are heartbroken and decide to change for the better, especially Juan and Tri. After collapsing again at an event, Ina is rushed to the hospital, where Rowena is also due to give birth. All the children except Por arrive at her bedside. Ina initially thinks a light outside the room is God, which turns out to be from a film shoot. Then, another doctor arrives and says Ina has recovered. Ina and her family then celebrate the christening of Rowena's daughter when Frank, whom Ina has a crush on, arrives. Seven then gets marri

Cast
 Ai-Ai delas Alas as Ina Montecillo
 Eugene Domingo as Rowena
 Marvin Agustin as Juan Montecillo
 Nikki Valdez as Getrudis "Tudis" Montecillo
 Carlo Aquino as Dimitri "Tri" Montecillo
 Alwyn Uytingco as Peter Tirso "Pip" Montecillo
 Marc Acueza as Sixto "Six" Montecillo
 Shaina Magdayao as Severina "Seven" Montecillo
 Serena Dalrymple as Catherine "Cate" Montecillo
 Jiro Manio as Samuel "Shammy" Montecillo
 Yuuki Kadooka as Martin "Ten-Ten" Montecillo
 Bianca Calma as Connie Montecillo
 Janella Calma as Sweet Montecillo
 Xyriel Manabat as Monay Montecillo
 Kaye Abad as Jenny Montecillo
 Jon Avila as Frank
 Rafael Rosell as Troy
 Debraliz as Doctor 2
 Ricky Rivero as Doctor 1
 Cecil Paz as Malena
 DJ Durano as Harold
 Bea Saw as one of the interview team
 Cherry Pie Picache as President Ren Constantino
 Tonton Gutierrez as Joe/Alfredo Monteagudo
 Jestoni Alarcon as Kevin/Francisco "Kiko" Montecillo
 Dennis Padilla as Nick/Eduardo "Eddie" Montenegro
 Empoy Marquez as William

Production

Development
Aside from Ai-Ai delas Alas, Eugene Domingo also returns in the last installment as Rowena. Majority of the characters reprise their roles in the film. Marvin Agustin, Kaye Abad, Nikki Valdez, Marc Acueza return in the last film after being absent in the previous sequel. Among the cast, Heart Evangelista is the only character to not appear in the final sequel due to reasons unknown. Also in this film, appearances of Ina's husbands played by Tonton Gutierrez as Alfredo, Jestoni Alarcon as Kiko, and Dennis Padilla as Eddie with the exception of Edu Manzano as Tony.

Awards

Crossover sequel

In 2011, there was a rumored crossover between Enteng Kabisote and Ang Tanging Ina titled Enteng ng Ina Mo. The film was an official entry for the 2011 Metro Manila Film Festival which was released on December 25, 2011. It breaks the four-day record of The Unkabogable Praybeyt Benjamin with a record of ₱110 million.

Trivia
 The characters of Joe, Nick and Kevin were derived from the Jonas Brothers.
 In the wedding of President Ren Constantino, she was covered by a white cloth. This is similar to the wedding of Korina Sanchez to Mar Roxas where Sanchez was approaching the Church while covered with a white cloth.

See also
 Ang Tanging Ina (film series)
 Ang Tanging Ina
 Enteng ng Ina Mo

References

External links
 

Philippine Christmas comedy-drama films
2010s Christmas comedy-drama films
Star Cinema films
Star Cinema comedy films
Star Cinema drama films
Films directed by Wenn V. Deramas
Philippine sequel films
2010 comedy films
2010 films
2010 drama films
Films about cancer
2010s English-language films
2010s Tagalog-language films